John of Poland may refer to:

 John I Albert of Poland (1459–1501)
 John II Casimir Vasa (1609–1672)
 Jan III Sobieski (1629–1696)

See also
 John I (disambiguation)
 John II (disambiguation)
 John III (disambiguation)